Kazimierz Adamski (born 1964) is a Polish sculptor.

Biography
He studied at the Jan Matejko Academy of Fine Arts from 1988 to 1993. He created the Old Testament prophet statues in the Krasicki Palace in Krasiczyn near Przemyśl. He is also designer of the coin "Cracoviae Merenti" and statuettes in his native Krakow.

References
Luke White, Kazimierz Adamski. Carving, Historical Museum of Krakow, Krakow 2007.

External links
Official site

See also
List of Polish sculptors

Polish sculptors
Polish male sculptors
1964 births
Living people
Artists from Kraków